Svetlya Peak is a peak on the Antarctic Peninsula of Antarctica.  The rocky, partly ice-free peak, rising to 716 m, is at the east extremity of Poibrene Heights on Blagoevgrad Peninsula, Oscar II Coast in Graham Land.  It overlooks Vaughan Inlet to the northeast.

Svetlya Peak is named after the settlement of Svetlya in Western Bulgaria.

Location
British mapping in 1974.

Maps
 British Antarctic Territory: Graham Land.  Scale 1:250000 topographic map.  BAS 250 Series, Sheet SQ 19-20.  London, 1974.
 Antarctic Digital Database (ADD). Scale 1:250000 topographic map of Antarctica. Scientific Committee on Antarctic Research (SCAR). Since 1993, regularly upgraded and updated.

Notes

References
 Svetlya Peak. SCAR Composite Antarctic Gazetteer.
 Bulgarian Antarctic Gazetteer. Antarctic Place-names Commission. (details in Bulgarian, basic data in English)

External links
 Svetlya Peak. Copernix satellite image

Mountains of Graham Land
Oscar II Coast
Bulgaria and the Antarctic